Township 2 is one of five townships in Washington County, Nebraska, United States. The population was 2,338 at the 2000 census. A 2006 estimate placed the township's population at 2,473.

A portion of the Village of Kennard lies within the Township.

See also
County government in Nebraska

References

Townships in Washington County, Nebraska
Townships in Nebraska